Eduard (Esra) Glass (born 1902 - died after 1980) was an Austrian chess master.

He won at Vienna 1927, and shared 1st with Erich Eliskases at Innsbruck 1929 (Austrian Chess Championship). He played several times in the Trebitsch Memorial in Vienna.

Glass represented Austria in the 5th Chess Olympiad at Folkestone 1933. In April 1935, he tied for 3rd-5th in Tel Aviv (the 2nd Maccabiah Games, Abram Blass won). He tied for 8-10th at Budapest 1936 (Mieczysław Najdorf and Lajos Steiner won). After Anschluss in 1938, he became imprisoned in Dachau concentration camp where he won the camp chess tournament once ahead of Georg Klaus. Later he moved to China, and living in the Shanghai Ghetto survived World War II.

After the war, Glass participated in the first Israeli Chess Championship in 1951. There he collected 8 points in 13 games, finishing on rank 3. The winner, Menachem Oren, achieved 9 points. Later Glass took 15th at Marianske Lazne 1959 (Lev Polugaevsky won), and took 5th at Reggio Emilia 1960/61.

References

External links

1902 births
Austrian Jews
Austrian chess players
Jewish chess players
Jewish Chinese history
Year of death missing